Lynfield Mount Hospital is a mental health facility in Heights Lane, Bradford, West Yorkshire, England. It is managed by Bradford District Care NHS Foundation Trust.

History
The facility has its origins in the Daisy Hill Union Workhouse, which was designed by Fred Holland and opened in 1913. It joined the National Health Service as Lynfield Mount Hospital in 1948. In 2015 it was announced that the newly-opened Daisy Hill centre at the hospital would offer intensive therapy during a six-month programme.

References

1913 establishments in England
Hospital buildings completed in 1913
Hospitals in Bradford
NHS hospitals in England